The 1974 congressional elections in Maryland were held on November 4, 1974, to determine who will represent the state of Maryland in the United States House of Representatives. Maryland has eight seats in the House, apportioned according to the 1970 United States Census. Representatives are elected for two-year terms; those elected served in the 94th Congress from January 3, 1975 until January 3, 1977.

Overview

|- style="background-color: #e9e9e9; font-weight: bold;"
! scope="row" colspan="2" style="text-align: right;" | Totals
| style="text-align: right;" | 8
| style="text-align: right;" | 0
| style="text-align: right;" | 0
| style="text-align: right;" | —
| style="text-align: right;" | 100%
| style="text-align: right;" | 100%
| style="text-align: right;" | 874,089
| style="text-align: right;" |
|}

External links 
Maryland State Board of Elections

References

1974
Maryland
United States House of Representatives